Dhruv Prashant Patel OBE (born 1984, London) is an Anglo-Indian businessman, community organiser and politician, who serves as a City Common Councilman since 2013.

In 2018 HM Birthday Honours, Patel was appointed OBE.

Career 
Patel has been returned as a Common Councilman of the City of London Corporation since 2013, and was appointed Chairman of the City Community and Children's Services in 2015. 

In 2019, he became the first Indian-origin Chairman of the City Bridge Trust, London's largest independent grant-making charity. Prior to serving as a Common Councilman he was an executive at Barclays Capital.

Patel is the founder of the City Hindus Network, an organisation based in the City of London which was set up in 2005 representing over 3,000 Hindu professionals. In 2007 he organised the first Hindu community engagement event at City Hall with support from then-Mayor Ken Livingstone to celebrate the contribution of Britain's half a million Hindus to the UK economy, culture and social life.

Patel organised the first celebration of the Hindu festival of Diwali at Mansion House, the official residence of the Lord Mayor of London in 2015.

In 2020 Patel supported the founding of the London Communities Response Fund to help provide money for organisations facing immediate financial pressures as a result of COVID-19.

Honours 
In the 2018 Queen's Birthday Honours, Patel was appointed an Officer of the Order of the British Empire for services to the British Hindu community and promoting social cohesion.

Personal life 
Married to Anita Patel with two children, they featured in the annual Asian power couples list in 2019.

References 

Living people
1983 births
Alumni of Imperial College London
Barclays people
Businesspeople from London
Councilmen of the City of London
English Hindus
Officers of the Order of the British Empire